Charles "Chuck" Spano is a Florida-based improvisational percussionist.

Spano is known for his experimentation with unusual rhythms, time signatures and unusual or indigenous instruments. He is  a proponent of "simple"  or found percussive instrumentation and is also a proponent of cross-/polyrhythms and when playing with other capable musicians he often will introduce contrasting but complementary polyrhythms, especially when playing bodhran or washboard. He teaches simple percussive techniques to a wide range of students from young elementary age students to those in their 80s and above. He is primarily a hand percussionist though he also investigates and uses, where appropriate, current technology digital devices such as Alternate Mode and Roland percussive products.

Spano teaches various percussion workshops at festivals and special events and, depending on the festival, may offer workshops on bodhran, simple percussion techniques, introduction to hand percussion and percussive washboard,  and  develops workshops specific to the needs of the sponsoring organization or event.

Spano's focus (2010–2019) is on the bodhran (Celtic frame drum) and a specialized highly percussive washboard style wherein he plays a full-size or double washboard with thimbles on all five fingers of both hands, often using a bone china thimble on one or two fingers of each hand - he incorporates the use of various board-mounted tone blocks or alternative metal surfaces to aid in tonal differentiation. His mentor on the bodhran is a multi-time All-Ireland champion.

Spano (as of 2019) still plays regularly at  festivals and can be found playing with a variety of groups across a  diverse mix of genres including Celtic, classical, rock 'n roll, Old Time, new age, country, reggae and blues. He  often plays with half a dozen or more groups during a festival. His normal performance instruments are typically custom made or of his own manufacture with bodhrans from Scotland, Ireland, and Germany, cajóns/djembes made to his specifications from Canada; frottoirs and triangles for Cajun music made in Louisiana. His washboards are exclusively Nationals and include zinc, porcelain enameled, brass, glass, and wood versions. He won first place in rhythm/percussion for 2010–2011 in Florida Old Time Music competition

He can also be found playing with various street musician groups along the east coast as well as overseas - he says that the street musicians offer him the ultimate in improvisational challenges as they are all new and unfamiliar musicians with different interpretations of the music being played and who often/usually play their own/new music which provides him with the ultimate challenge in adapting his percussive insights to tunes which may only be played once.

Spano is also highly involved with the development and presentation of the musical component of various festivals, principally in Florida, including Celtic, Blues, and Contemporary Americana events.

In 2011 or 2012 Spano gave an impromptu workshop after his regularly scheduled general percussion workshop at the Florida Folk Festival - this impromptu workshop lasted 2–3 hours and was done as part of his beginning work on a book or guide related to "putting your own signature/style on tunes" - He repeated this in 2018 and 2019 events with other workshop topics oriented towards the washboard and/or bodhran. Spano has taught percussion workshops for many years, both privately and at events/festivals including the Florida Folk Festival (which was cancelled for 2020 due to Covid) - his "after class" workshop in 2019 was considered by many to be one of the best workshops they had experienced. Spano is currently considering creation of a video tutorial/workshop on percussive workshop techniques.

References

External links 
 
 
 
 
 
 
 
 
 
 
 
 
 
 
 
 

Year of birth missing (living people)
Living people
People from Florida
American percussionists
American male musicians